Nandesari railway station is a railway station in Nandesari town of Vadodara district on the Western Railway zone of the Indian Railways. Passenger, MEMU trains halt here.

Station code of Nandesari is NDR. It has 2 platforms.

References

Railway stations in Vadodara district
Vadodara railway division
Year of establishment missing